Rudolf Lehmann (30 January 1914 – 17 September 1983) was a mid-ranking commander the Waffen-SS of Nazi Germany during World War II. He was a recipient of the Knight's Cross of the Iron Cross. Following the war, Lehmann authored a unit history of SS Division Leibstandarte published in German by HIAG, the post-war Waffen-SS lobby group, and in English by J.J. Fedorowicz Publishing.

Career
Born in 1914, Lehmann joined the Waffen-SS in April 1935.  He was then posted to the Germania regiment of the SS, which later became SS Division Das Reich, and then to the Leibstandarte SS Adolf Hitler in October 1940. In late 1944, Lehmann moved to the 1st SS Panzer Corps as chief of staff. He remained in this position until March 1945, when he was made divisional commander of the SS Division Das Reich. He led the division through Operation Spring Awakening, the battles around Lake Balaton and Vienna. 

After the war, Lehmann authored volumes I II and III of the unit history of the Leibstandarte produced under the auspices of HIAG, a lobby group and a revisionist veteran's organisation established by former high-ranking Waffen-SS personnel. The works were published in 1977–82 by the right-wing publishing house . Lehmann died in 1983.

Awards
Iron Cross (1939) 2nd Class (15 November 1939) & 1st Class (29 May 1940)
German Cross in Gold on 1 November 1943 as SS-Sturmbannführer in the SS Division Leibstandarte
Knight's Cross of the Iron Cross with Oak Leaves
 Knights Cross on 23 February 1944 as SS-Obersturmbannführer and Ia (operations officer) of the SS Division Leibstandarte
Lehmann was nominated for Oak Leaves towards the end of the war. No credible evidence of the award can be found in the German Federal Archives. The Oak Leaves award was unlawfully presented by Sepp Dietrich on 6 May 1945, which was announced by the 6th Panzer Army.

References

Citations

Bibliography

 
 
 

1914 births
1983 deaths
Military personnel from Heidelberg
SS-Standartenführer
Recipients of the Gold German Cross
Recipients of the Knight's Cross of the Iron Cross with Oak Leaves
People from the Grand Duchy of Baden
Waffen-SS personnel
German military writers